General elections were held in Barbados on 15 January 2008. A concurrent referendum to determine whether or not to become a republic was initially planned but vote was postponed.

The Democratic Labour Party (DLP), which had been in opposition since 1994, won with 20 seats to 10 seats for the Barbados Labour Party, led by Prime Minister Owen Arthur. Recounts were held in some constituencies due to close results.

On 11 September 2008 Hamilton Lashley MP, for St. Michael South-East announced he would cross the floor and no longer be a member of the Barbados Labour Party, but would instead become an independent. His defection brought the BLP as Opposition down to nine seats for the remainder of the Parliamentary session. He later decided to join the ruling DLP party.

DLP chairman David Thompson was sworn in as Prime Minister on 16 January. After David Thompson died in October 2010 a by-election was held in January 2011 to fill his vacant seat for St. John.

Results

References 

Barbados
General election
Elections in Barbados
January 2008 events in North America